Pittet is a surname. Notable people with the surname include:

Didier Pittet (born 1957), Swiss infectious diseases expert
Mikael Pittet (born 1975), Swiss research scientist

Surnames of French origin